AE binding protein 1 is a protein that in humans is encoded by the AEBP1 gene.

Function
AE binding protein 1 is a member of carboxypeptidase A protein family. The protein may function as a transcriptional repressor and play a role in adipogenesis and smooth muscle cell differentiation. Studies in mice suggest that the AEBP1 gene that encodes the protein functions in wound healing and abdominal wall development. Overexpression of this gene is associated with glioblastoma.

References

External links

Further reading